The 2023 London Broncos season is the 44th year in the club's history, the fourth consecutive season out of the Super League and their second season at Plough Lane as tenants of AFC Wimbledon. They will be coached by Director of Rugby Mike Eccles. The Broncos will compete in both the 2023 Betfred Championship and the 2023 Challenge Cup.

2023 squad

Regular season table

Fixtures and Results

Pre-season

Betfred Championship

Notes

Transfers

In

Out

Statistics

References

External links
London Broncos website
FIXTURES
Rugby League Project - London Broncos - Second Division 2023

London Broncos seasons
London Broncos season
2023 in rugby league by club
London Broncos